Oscar Peterson and the Bassists – Montreux '77 is a 1977 live album by Oscar Peterson.

Track listing
 "There Is No Greater Love" (Marty Symes, Isham Jones) – 6:18
 "You Look Good to Me" (Seymour Lefco, Clement Wells) –  7:02
 "People" (Bob Merrill, Jule Styne)  – 6:31
 "Reunion Blues" (Milt Jackson) – 6:45
 "Teach Me Tonight" (Sammy Cahn, Gene de Paul) – 9:18
 "Sweet Georgia Brown" (Ben Bernie, Maceo Pinkard, Kenneth Casey) – 5:10
 "Soft Winds" (Benny Goodman, Fletcher Henderson) – 6:27

Personnel

Performance
 Oscar Peterson – piano
 Ray Brown – double bass
 Niels-Henning Ørsted Pedersen – double bass

References

Oscar Peterson live albums
Albums produced by Norman Granz
1977 live albums
Pablo Records live albums